Urban as a given name or surname may refer to:

Given name
Pope Urban (disambiguation)
Urban of Langres, 4th-century French saint and bishop
Urban (bishop of Llandaff) (1076–1134), Welsh bishop
Urban of Macedonia, 1st-century bishop, martyr and saint
Urban Blitz, English rock musician
Urban Federer, Swiss Catholic prelate
Urban Gad (1879–1947), Danish film director
Urban Hansen, Danish politician
Urban Meyer, American football coach
Urban Priol, German comedian
Urban Shocker, American baseball pitcher

Surname
 Adolf Urban (1914–1943), German footballer
 Aleksandra Urban (born 1978), Polish painter 
 Amanda Urban (born 1946/7), American literary agent
 Charles Urban (1867–1942), Anglo-American film producer and distributor
 Damir Urban (born 1968), Croatian rock singer/songwriter
 , Brazilian entomologist
 Eric Urban, mathematician
 Ewald Urban (1913–1959), Polish footballer
 Faye Urban (1945–2020), Canadian tennis player
 Friedrich Maria Urban (1878–1964), Austrian psychologist
 Gábor Urbán (born 1984), Hungarian footballer
 Gasper Urban (1923–1998), American football player
 George Urban (1921–1997), Hungarian writer, journalist and radio broadcaster
George Urban Jr. (1850–1928), American businessman
 Glen L. Urban (born 1940), American professor
 Ignatz Urban (1848–1931), German botanist
 Jan Urban (born 1962), Polish footballer and manager
  (1874-1940), Polish Jesuit, historian
 Jerheme Urban (born 1980), American National Football League player
 Jerzy Urban (1933–2022), Polish journalist, writer, politician and former communist press secretary
 Josef Urban (1899–1968), Czechoslovak wrestler
 Joseph Urban (1872–1933), Austrian artist and architect
 Karl Urban (disambiguation)
 Keith Urban (born 1967), Australian country music singer, songwriter and record producer
 Klaudiusz Urban (born 1968), Polish chess player
 Łukasz Robert Urban, Polish victim of 2016 Berlin truck attack, original truck driver 
 Marcus Urban (born 1971), German footballer and diversity adviser
 Mark Urban (born 1961), British journalist and writer
 Mark C. Urban, American biologist and professor
 Matt Urban (1919–1995), American lieutenant colonel and Medal of Honor recipient
 Milo Urban (1904–1982), Slovak writer, journalist and World War II collaborator
 Miloš Urban (born 1967), Czech horror novelist
 Paweł Urban, chemistry professor working at the National Tsing Hua University
 Pavo Urban (1968–1991), Croatian photographer
 Peter Urban (disambiguation)
 Shirley M. Frye (née Urban), American mathematics educator
 Stuart Urban (born 1958), British film and television director
 Tim Urban (born 1989), American singer

See also
 Benjamin D'Urban (1777–1849), British general and colonial administrator
 D'Urban Armstrong (1897–1918), South African First World War flying ace
 Urbanus, Belgian comedian
 Orban, Hungarian iron founder and engineer
 Urpo (Finnish), Urbánek (Czech/Slovak), Urbonavičius (Lithuanian), Urbanowicz (Polish)

Given names
Surnames
German-language surnames
German masculine given names